The Close Encounters Tour was a concert tour by British recording artist, Robbie Williams. Running from April to December 2006, the tour supported Williams' sixth studio album, Intensive Care. To date, it was the singer's largest tour, playing over 50 shows in Africa, Asia, Europe, the Americas, and Australia. It is believed to have played to over 3 million spectators and earned over $60 million. The name is derived from the 1977 film, Close Encounters of the Third Kind.

Opening acts
Freshlyground (Africa)
Chris Coco (Europe, South America, Australia)
Basement Jaxx (Europe)
Orson (Europe)
Sneaky Sound System (Australia)
La Portuaria (Buenos Aires)

Setlist
The following setlist was obtained from the concert held on 10 April 2006, at the ABSA Stadium in Durban, South Africa. It does not represent all concerts for the duration of the tour. 
"Instrumental Sequence" (contains elements of "The Five Tones and Mountain Visions")
"Radio"
"Rock DJ"
"Tripping"
"Monsoon"
"Sin Sin Sin"
"Supreme"
"The Trouble With Me"
"Millennium"
"Back for Good"
"Advertising Space"
"There She Goes"
"Ghosts"
"Come Undone"
"Feel"
"A Place to Crash"
"Kids"
"Make Me Pure"
Encore
"Let Me Entertain You"
"Strong"
"Angels"

Tour dates

Cancellations and rescheduled shows

Box office score data

External links
Official site

References

Robbie Williams concert tours
2006 concert tours